Callianira is a genus of ctenophores belonging to the family Mertensiidae.

The species of this genus are found in Europe, Northern America, Southernmost Southern America, Antarctica.

Species:

Callianira antarctica 
Callianira bialata 
Callianira compressa 
Callianira cristata 
Callianira diploptera 
Callianira ficalbi 
Callianira hexagona

References

Ctenophore genera
Tentaculata